The 2011–12 Louisville Lightning season was the third season of the Louisville Lightning professional indoor soccer club. The Lightning, an Eastern Division team in the Professional Arena Soccer League, played their home games in the Mockingbird Valley Soccer Club in Louisville, Kentucky. The team was led by general manager Nick Stover and head coach Scott Budnick with associate coach Ted Nichols.

On October 28, 2011, the Lightning played a pre-season split-squad exhibition match dubbed the "Kick Cancer Game". The team won 11 games and lost 5 during the 2011–12 regular season. They played all 16 of these games against Eastern Division rivals Cincinnati Kings, Detroit Waza, Illinois Piasa, Kansas Magic, and Ohio Vortex. The team qualified for the postseason but lost to the Kansas Magic in the first round of the playoffs.

The Louisville Lightning also participated in the 2011–12 United States Open Cup for Arena Soccer. The team defeated Indy Elite FC in the wild card round but lost to the Cincinnati Kings in the Round of 16, ending their run in the tournament.

After this season, the team announced it would skip the 2012–13 PASL season and go dormant. In a March 2013 interview, team owner Ted Nichols said that low attendance at games placed "somewhat of a financial drain" on the organization and that the team remains "in a bit of a hiatus".

Off-field moves
In October 2011, the Lightning announced a partnership with the PUMA sportswear company. The team wore PUMA soccer jerseys, warm-up gear, and training gear for the 2011–12 season. In the team's first two years of existence, they had worn Adidas gear and jerseys.

Pre-game activities at the team's home opener included an awareness event for St. Jude Children's Research Hospital, distribution of can koozies (holders) to fans, and a "first kick" ceremony with country singer Darren Warren.

Schedule

Regular season

† Game also counts for US Open Cup, as listed in chart below.

Postseason

2011–12 United States Open Cup for Arena Soccer

Player roster

References

External links
Louisville Lightning official website

Louisville Lightning
Louisville Lightning
Soccer in Kentucky
Louisville Lightning season
Louisville Lightning season